Kate Adebola Okikiolu (born 1965) is a British mathematician. She is known for her work with elliptic differential operators as well as her work with inner-city children.

Early life and education
Okikiolu was born in 1965 in England. Her father was George Olatokunbo Okikiolu, a renowned Nigerian mathematician and the most published black mathematician on record. Her British mother was a high school mathematics teacher. Okikiolu received a B.A. in mathematics from Cambridge University in 1987. In 1991 she earned her Ph.D. in mathematics from the University of California at Los Angeles, for her thesis The Analogue of the Strong Szego Limit Theorem on the Torus and the 3-Sphere.

Career
Based on her PhD work, Okikiolu resolved a conjecture of Peter Wilcox Jones concerning a continuous version of the travelling salesman problem.   in her paper Characterization of subsets of rectifiable curves in 
Okikiolu was an instructor and later assistant professor at Princeton University from 1993 to 1995. She then worked as a visiting assistant professor at the Massachusetts Institute of Technology and joined the faculty at the University of California at San Diego in 1995. In 2011 she joined the Mathematics Department at Johns Hopkins University.

She was an invited speaker at the 1996 meeting of the Association of Women in Mathematics. She also delivered the Claytor-Woodard lecture at the 2002 meeting of the National Association of Mathematicians, an organization for African-American mathematicians.

Honors and awards
In 1997, Okikiolu won a Sloan Research Fellowship, becoming the first black recipient of this fellowship. In 1997 she also was awarded a Presidential Early Career Award for Scientists and Engineers for both her mathematical research and her development of mathematics curricula for inner-city school children. This award is given to only 60 scientists and engineers each year and has a prize of $500,000.

References

External links
 Faculty page at Johns Hopkins
 Theorems by Kate Okikiolu at Theorem of the Day.

1965 births
Living people
Black British women academics
20th-century British mathematicians
20th-century American mathematicians
21st-century American mathematicians
Alumni of the University of Cambridge
English people of Nigerian descent
English people of Yoruba descent
Massachusetts Institute of Technology faculty
University of California, San Diego faculty
British emigrants to the United States
Johns Hopkins University faculty
Princeton University faculty
Nigerian women academics
American women mathematicians
African-American mathematicians
20th-century women mathematicians
21st-century women mathematicians
University of California, Los Angeles alumni
21st-century African-American women